Brigadier-General Abner Monroe Perrin (February 2, 1827 – May 12, 1864) was an American lawyer who served as a senior officer of the Confederate States Army in the American Civil War until killed in action at the Battle of Spotsylvania Court House.

Early life and education
Perrin was born in the Edgefield District, South Carolina. He fought in the Mexican–American War as a lieutenant in the infantry. Upon his return home, he studied law and was admitted to the bar in 1854.

American Civil War
When the Civil War began, Perrin entered the Confederate service as a captain in the 14th South Carolina Infantry that was attached to Brig. Gen. Maxcy Gregg's brigade of the famous "Light Division" of Maj. Gen. A.P. Hill.

Perrin saw service with Gregg's Brigade through all of its major battles, including the Seven Days, Second Bull Run (Second Manassas), Antietam, and Fredericksburg. When Gregg's successor, Samuel McGowan, was wounded at Chancellorsville, Perrin took command of the brigade and led it at the subsequent Battle of Gettysburg in the division of Maj. Gen. William Dorsey Pender in Hill's new Third Corps. At Gettysburg, on July 1, 1863, Perrin's brigade was involved in the Confederate attack that captured Seminary Ridge. On September 10, 1863, Perrin was promoted to the rank of brigadier general. Upon the return of McGowan, Perrin was transferred to command the Alabama brigade previously led by Brig. Gen. Cadmus Wilcox in the division of Maj. Gen. Richard H. Anderson (Wilcox had been appointed to command the division of Pender, who had died from a wound received at Gettysburg).

Perrin was conspicuously brave at the Battle of the Wilderness in May 1864. In the next battle, Spotsylvania Court House, he declared "I shall come out of this fight a live major general or a dead brigadier." When the "Mule Shoe" (or "Bloody Angle") was overrun and most of Maj. Gen. Edward "Allegheny" Johnson's division was captured on May 12, 1864, units from the Third Corps—including Perrin's brigade—were called in to help. Leading his troops in a spirited counterattack through a very heavy fire, with his sword in hand, Perrin was riddled with bullets and died instantly, shot seven times. He is buried in the Confederate Cemetery in Fredericksburg, Virginia.

See also
 List of Confederate States Army generals

References
 Eicher, John H., and David J. Eicher, Civil War High Commands. Stanford: Stanford University Press, 2001. .
 Sifakis, Stewart. Who Was Who in the Civil War. New York: Facts On File, 1988. .
 Warner, Ezra J. Generals in Gray: Lives of the Confederate Commanders. Baton Rouge: Louisiana State University Press, 1959. .

1827 births
1864 deaths
Confederate States Army brigadier generals
Confederate States of America military personnel killed in the American Civil War
People from Edgefield County, South Carolina
People of South Carolina in the American Civil War